Hurricane Ike was a powerful tropical cyclone that swept through portions of the Greater Antilles and Northern America in September 2008, wreaking havoc on infrastructure and agriculture, particularly in Cuba and Texas. Ike took a similar track to the 1900 Galveston hurricane. The ninth tropical storm, fifth hurricane, and third major hurricane of the 2008 Atlantic hurricane season, Ike developed from a tropical wave west of Cape Verde on September 1 and strengthened to a peak intensity as a Category 4 hurricane over the open waters of the central Atlantic on September 4 as it tracked westward. Several fluctuations in strength occurred before Ike made landfall on eastern Cuba on September 8. The hurricane weakened prior to continuing into the Gulf of Mexico, but increased its intensity by the time of its final landfall in Galveston, Texas, on September 13 before becoming an extratropical storm on September 14. The remnants of Ike continued to track across the United States and into Canada, causing considerable damage inland, before dissipating on the next day.

Ike was blamed for at least 195 deaths. Of these deaths, 74 were in Haiti, which was already trying to recover from the impact of three storms (Fay, Gustav, and Hanna) that had made landfall the same year. Seven people were killed in Cuba. In the United States, 113 people were reported killed, directly or indirectly, and 16 were still missing as of August 2011. Due to its immense size, Ike caused devastation from the Louisiana coastline all the way to the Kenedy County region near Corpus Christi, Texas. In addition, Ike caused flooding and significant damage along the Mississippi coastline and the Florida Panhandle. Damages from Ike in U.S. coastal and inland areas are estimated at $30 billion (2008 USD), with additional damage of $7.3 billion in Cuba, $200 million in the Bahamas, and $500 million in the Turks and Caicos, amounting to a total of at least $38 billion in damage. At the time, the hurricane was the second-costliest in United States history. The search-and-rescue operation after Ike was the largest search-and-rescue operation in Texas history.

Meteorological history

The origins of Hurricane Ike can be traced back to a well-defined tropical wave first identified by the National Hurricane Center (NHC) just within the western coast of Africa on August 28. Despite the development of a low-pressure area associated with the wave and signs of organization within favorable conditions near the Cape Verde Islands, the system was only able to generate intermittent thunderstorm activity. The broad low-pressure continued to track westward and was considered to have become sufficiently organized to be classified as a tropical depression at 06:00 UTC on September 1. Although post-analysis indicated that the depression reached tropical storm strength at 12:00 UTC that day, operationally the NHC began issuing advisories on Ike three hours later, by which time the system had already gained numerous curved rainbands and well-established outflow. Over the next few hours, Ike developed additional rainbands, but failed to develop a centralized area of convection due to the presence of dry air to the storm's south and its location in an area with only marginally favorable sea surface temperatures. These factors were also responsible for Ike's slow developmental trend that began after formation.

Ike's gradual strengthening began to quicken early on September 3, with the strengthening of an intense rainband around the center of the storm. At roughly 15:00 UTC that day, microwave imaging indicated that a primordial eye was developing within the intensifying tropical storm. Tracking northwestward, the NHC upgraded Ike to hurricane status at 18:00 UTC based on objective satellite intensity estimates and the appearance of the eye on visible satellite imagery. Ike's placement in an area with virtually no wind shear allowed for the hurricane to undergo explosive intensification despite unfavorable upper-level winds to its north, reaching major hurricane strength six hours after its designation as a hurricane. After peaking in strength, a ridge of high pressure to the storm's west strengthened, causing Ike to track towards the southwest—a path unusual for the time of year. Although wind shear abated and allowed for reintensification, Ike would fluctuate in strength over the next few days.

After passing over Inagua, the development of a double eyewall—a feature that usually denotes the beginning of an eyewall replacement cycle—slightly weakened Ike late on September 7. However, the hurricane was able to reintensify and reach Category 4 intensity for a final time before making landfall near Cabo Lucrecia on the coast of Holguín Province in Cuba by 00:00 UTC the next day. Although Ike remained well-defined for most of its crossing of eastern Cuba, the hurricane's core had become disrupted by the time it had reached the Caribbean Sea after spending a few hours over land. Over the next day, Ike tracked westward, paralleling the southern coast of Cuba without much intensification; at times the center of the hurricane was within  of the island. Roughly six hours later, the hurricane emerged into the Gulf of Mexico as a slightly weakened system.

Despite tracking back over water, Ike's prolonged interaction with Cuba had greatly disrupted the system's core, and instead of quickly strengthening and coalescing, the storm's wind field instead grew and only gradual intensification ensued. Due to the storm's comparatively small inner core and intensity of the outer rainbands, an eyewall replacement cycle took place, preventing Ike from rapidly intensifying. At around the same time, a high-pressure area strengthened to the hurricane's north, steering the cyclone further west than initially anticipated. By late on September 12, Ike had reached the western edge of the nearby high-pressure area and began to curve northward. After tracking inland, Ike weakened as it sped northward and later northeastward, weakening to tropical storm status east of Palestine, Texas late on September 13 and later becoming a powerful extratropical cyclone on September 14 over the Ozarks. A more steady weakening phase ensued, and after tracking across southern Ontario and Quebec, the remnants of Ike were absorbed by another extratropical low near the St. Lawrence River, on September 15.

Preparations

Turks and Caicos Islands and The Bahamas

Fearing a repeat of Hurricane Donna in 1960, the overseas branch of the British Red Cross began preparing contingency plans for 2,000 families considered to be at risk from Ike. A group of 260 Chinese construction workers stuck on Middle Caicos after the passage of Hurricane Hanna were evacuated by the British Red Cross. Immediately before the storm struck, 348 people on Grand Turk were put into emergency shelters.

Florida

On September 5, Florida Governor Charlie Crist declared a state of emergency in advance of Ike's arrival, (which was expected to be as early as September 8). Authorities in Key West issued a mandatory evacuation for all visitors for September 6. The Federal Emergency Management Agency (FEMA) positioned supplies, and emergency response crews in Florida and along the Gulf Coast.

Florida Keys officials began evacuations on the low-lying chain of islands in phases, starting at the end in Key West by 8 am Sunday and continuing throughout the day—at noon for the Middle Keys, and at 4 pm for the Upper Keys, including Key Largo. Visitors were told to leave on Saturday. Overall 15,000 tourists evacuated, but the storm stayed to the south, only causing minor beach erosion.

Texas

On September 7, The Texas Water/Wastewater Agency Response Network (TXWARN) activated its 700-member utility mutual aid network and began coordination with the State Emergency Operations Center and the Texas Commission on Environmental Quality (TCEQ) to begin preparations and notifications to utilities to prepare for Ike. State rural water associations activated mutual aid networks to prepare for the landfall of Ike while still providing assistance to areas affected by Hurricane Gustav. The Texas Rural Water Association held meetings with state agencies on September 9, to plan for landfall along the Texas Gulf Coast.

On September 11, forecasting models began to show Ike making landfall just south of Galveston. City Manager Steven LeBlanc late Wednesday issued a mandatory evacuation order for the low-lying west end of Galveston Island. Later, the mandatory evacuation order was extended to the entire island of Galveston, as well as low-lying areas around Houston, Texas.  Mandatory evacuations were also ordered for Jefferson, Orange, and Chambers counties located east of Houston. Voluntary evacuations were in effect for Hardin and Tyler as well as Newton and Jasper counties. Residents evacuating ahead of Ike were received by emergency workers in the Dallas/Fort Worth(DFW) Metroplex where they were provided a place of refuge, medical treatment, and provisions. In addition to the orders of local and state officials, federal officials were thoroughly involved in evacuation decisions. On September 10, U.S. President George W. Bush made an emergency declaration for Texas, making more federal help available for preparations and evacuations. More than one million people evacuated in advance of Hurricane Ike, but more than 100,000 people did not.

At 8:19 pm (CDT) September 11, the National Weather Service in Houston/Galveston, Texas issued a strongly worded bulletin, regarding storm surge along the shoreline of Galveston Bay. The bulletin advised that residents living in single-family homes in some parts of coastal Texas faced "certain death" if they did not heed orders to evacuate. Reports said as many as 40 percent of Galveston's citizens did not pay attention to the warnings.

The price of gas increased in the expectation of damage to some of the numerous oil refineries along the South Texas coast, or at least delays in production from the oil and gas platforms in the Gulf of Mexico. 14 oil refineries shut down production and nearly 150 oil tankers and cargo ships waited off-shore as every port from Lake Charles, Louisiana to Corpus Christi, Texas shut down in preparation for the storm.

Impact

Turks and Caicos Islands and The Bahamas

Power was lost throughout Grand Turk Island, an estimated 80%–95% of the houses there were damaged, 20% of which was a total loss. There was also significant structural damage to roofs and buildings containing health services resulting in the disruption of most health services. The local pharmacy roof collapsed, destroying the area's prescription drug supply, the police station, and the prison was significantly damaged and local supplies facilities were either damaged or destroyed. A two-year-old cruise ship terminal on Grand Turk owned by Carnival Cruise Lines was significantly damaged. Water and electricity were also disrupted but since have been restored. Meanwhile, in South Caicos, 95% of the houses were also damaged, with over one-third significantly damaged or destroyed. Damage also occurred on other islands, mostly agricultural or the fishing industry, but in general, the damage was minor.

Buildings on the islands have been severely weakened and 750 people have lost their homes. Due to the extent and magnitude of damage and affected the population, the Government of the Turks and Caicos declared Grand Turk and South Caicos Islands disaster areas.

In Great Inagua Island, The Bahamas, eighty percent of houses sustained damage with almost a third of them having significant damage. The local Morton Salt factory was damaged and shut down operations. A few outlining islands suffered minor damage and no casualties were reported. Overall damage from the Turks and Caicos and The Bahamas was estimated between $50 million and $200 million.

Haiti 

The outer bands of Ike caused additional flooding in Haiti, which was already devastated by Hanna and also hit hard by Fay and Gustav. The last bridge still standing into the city of Gonaïves was washed away, slowing relief in the community considerably and creating a deep humanitarian and food crisis in the hard-hit region. 74 deaths were reported in Haiti from Ike, most of which were in the coastal community of Cabaret which was swept away by floodwaters and mudslides. Haitian Prime Minister Michèle Pierre-Louis called for help at the end of the week, saying that four storms in three weeks have left over 550 dead and as many as one million homeless.  She also said that parts of Gonaïves were so severely damaged that the city may have to be rebuilt elsewhere. Two additional deaths were reported in the Dominican Republic.

Cuba

About 2.6 million Cubans, a fourth of the population, were evacuated ahead of Ike. It passed across the central provinces of Holguín, Las Tunas, and Camagüey, emerging over the sea to the south of Cuba during the day. Ike dropped to Category One intensity by the time it crossed the island. It then followed the southern coast of Cuba and crossed the western end of the island in Pinar del Río Province, close to the path taken by Hurricane Gustav ten days previously. The western areas of Cuba, already devastated by just 10 days before Ike hit, suffered additional major flooding from the rain and storm surge. The sugar cane crop was devastated, with over  destroyed. The banana, yucca, coffee, and corn crops also suffered significant damage. Alongside Gustav, they were described as the "worst ever" storms by Cuban officials.

In total, seven people were killed in Cuba from Ike due to drowning or collapsing structures. Over 300,000 houses were damaged, with an estimated 43,000 a total loss. The combined damage estimate from Ike and Gustav, and succeeding Paloma is about $9.7 billion (USD), with $7.3 billion of that from Ike, making Ike the most destructive hurricane in Cuban history at the time. It was later surpassed by Hurricane Irma almost exactly nine years later.

United States

Due to the intensity of the storm, Texas closed many of its chemical plants and oil refineries. Because much of the United States oil refining capacity is located in Texas, the closings caused a temporary increase in the prices of gasoline, home heating oil, and natural gas. Increases were particularly high in North Carolina, especially in the mountains, where average prices were as much as 60 cents higher than the national average. The closing of refineries so soon after Hurricane Gustav, and the time required to restart production, also resulted in shortages of gasoline in such places as the Carolinas and Tennessee, partly as a result of panic buying.  113 direct and indirect deaths have been reported in the US, including 85 in Texas (18 direct), eight in Louisiana, one in Arkansas, two in Tennessee, one in Kentucky, seven in Indiana, four in Missouri, two in Illinois, two in Michigan, seven in Ohio and one in Pennsylvania. As of August 2011, 16 people remain unaccounted for, 11 of them in the Galveston area. On September 15, 2008, the United States Congress held a moment of silence for those who died in the hurricane.

MV Antalina
On September 11, the MV Antalina, a  cargo ship, was among the ships that left Port Arthur to avoid the hurricane. The ship had a crew of 22 and carried a cargo of petroleum coke. On September 12, the ship's engine failed, and the ship was adrift  from the shore. The crew unsuccessfully attempted to repair the engine and requested to be evacuated by the Coast Guard, but the rescue mission was aborted because weather conditions were not within the safety parameters. The crew was forced to ride out the storm but kept in contact with the Coast Guard. The ship successfully rode out the storm and all 22 crew members were uninjured. On September 13, a tugboat was dispatched to return the vessel to port.

Louisiana

The storm surge ahead of Ike blew onshore of Louisiana well ahead of Ike's predicted landfall in Texas on September 13. Areas in coastal south-central and southwestern Louisiana, some of which were flooded by Gustav, were re-flooded as a result of Ike. Some areas that had not yet recovered from Gustav power outages received additional outages. The hardest-hit areas were in and around Cameron Parish, with nearly every square inch of the coastline in that area was flooded heavily, reaching as far north as Lake Charles, nearly 30 miles inland. Hundreds of people had to be rescued, including 363 people who were rescued by Louisiana Department of Wildlife and Fisheries Search and Rescue teams in conjunction with the Louisiana National Guard and the U.S. Coast Guard.

One person was killed in a flooded bayou in Terrebonne Parish, and a wind-related death was reported near Houma. Two other deaths took place in a car crash in the evacuation phase in Iberville Parish, and two other storm-related deaths in Jefferson Davis Parish that were ruled as deaths by natural causes.

Texas

On the morning of September 13, 2008, the eye of Hurricane Ike approached the upper Texas coast, making landfall at 2:10 am CDT over the east end of Galveston Island, with a high storm surge, and travelled north up Galveston Bay, along the east side of Houston

(see storm-path image).
People in low-lying areas who had not heeded evacuation orders, in single-family one- or two-story homes, were warned by the weather service that they faced "certain death" from the overnight storm surge. Nearly 16,000 families in the Galveston-Houston area stayed in temporary shelters under federal housing programs, while 1700 were referred for assistance but could not be reached or were refused aid. 

In regional Texas towns, electrical power began failing on September 12 before 8 pm CDT,
leaving millions without power (estimates range from 2.8 million to 4.5 million customers). Grocery store shelves in the Houston area were empty for weeks in the aftermath of the storm.

In Galveston, by 4 pm CDT (2100 UTC) on September 12, the rising storm surge began overtopping the 17-ft (5.2 m) Galveston Seawall, which faces the Gulf of Mexico; waves had been crashing along the seawall earlier, from 9 am CDT.
Although Seawall Boulevard is elevated above the shoreline, many areas of town slope down behind the seawall to the lower elevation of Galveston Island.

Even though there were advance evacuation plans, Mary Jo Naschke, spokesperson for the city of Galveston, estimated that (as of Friday morning) a quarter of the city's residents paid no attention to calls for them to evacuate, despite predictions that most of Galveston Island would suffer heavy flooding from storm tide.  By 6 pm Friday night estimates varied as to how many of the 58,000 residents remained, but the figures of remaining residents were in the thousands.
Widespread flooding included downtown Galveston: six feet (2 m) deep inside the Galveston County Courthouse, and the University of Texas Medical Branch, the primary hospital in Galveston county, was dealt significant damage due to flooding. The wide-scale flooding caused failures to all the facilities systems and allowed mold to invade all the buildings. Tourist attractions on the island suffered various degrees of damage.

In Houston, windows also broke in downtown buildings, including the 75-story JP Morgan Chase Tower, and Reliant Stadium lost part of its roof. As a result of the high wind and eyewall that passed directly through the city, power outages were a major problem. Some residents were without electricity for over a month. Because the storm system moved rapidly and did not linger over Houston, flooding was not a major problem for most of the city, as it normally is in a storm event, as a result of the relatively flat topography.

On Bolivar Peninsula, Texas, dozens of people were rescued as flood waters exceeded 12 feet (3.7 m) above sea level in advance of the hurricane. Many residents, some trapped by high water on the road at Rollover Pass and others elsewhere along Bolivar Peninsula were not rescued. The peninsula bore the brunt of Ike's right-front quadrant, historically the worst part of a hurricane, and experienced catastrophic damage with the worst being between Rollover Pass and Gilchrist, Texas – west of High Island. Estimates of lost homes in the peninsula were around 80%.

Bridge City mayor Kirk Roccaforte estimated that only about 14 homes (later updated to around two dozen) in the city were unaffected by the surge. Ike also caused widespread wind damage throughout southeast Texas, but was not bad due to Hurricane Rita striking the region in 2005 and Hurricane Humberto in 2007.

NASA's Johnson Space Center  suffered minor roof damage to Mission Control and minor cosmetic damage to some of its other buildings.  NASA's operations at Ellington Field also sustained roof and awning damage, and one hangar was severely damaged.

Farther Inland

On September 14, after Ike became extratropical and was enhanced by an upper-level shortwave trough, a major wind event took place across the lower and middle Ohio Valley and lower Great Lakes, and significant rainfall and flooding took place to the west. The St. Louis Metropolitan Area experienced hurricane conditions, with Ike's remnants inflicting severe damage to homes.  Several areas in Illinois and Indiana, already flooded by the frontal boundto the north, saw significant additional rainfall. Due to flooding in Chicago, Todd Stroger declared a state of emergency for Cook County due to flooding of the Des Plaines River. Hurricane-force wind gusts were reported to the east of the centre across parts of Kentucky, Indiana, Ohio, and Pennsylvania with significant wind damage including structural damage to buildings and trees. The Louisville area declared a state of emergency due to major damage and power outages, and the Louisville International Airport was closed temporarily. A LG&E spokesperson said that this was the worst power outage in 30 years. Later in the day, a statewide state of emergency was declared in Kentucky by Governor Steve Beshear. Cincinnati-Northern Kentucky International Airport was also temporarily shut down, and the control tower was evacuated. In Cincinnati, numerous reports of roof damage and uprooted trees were called in to law enforcement, and on September 15, most of the schools in Hamilton County, Butler County, and Warren County had classes canceled because of power outages, some of which lasted seven days.

Additionally, a state of emergency was declared in Ohio. Damages in Ohio was originally estimated at $553 million with 131,000 insurance claims filed in the first few days following the storm. The overall total damage in Ohio exceeded $1.1 billion, tying the 1974 Xenia tornado as the costliest storm in Ohio's history. In Indiana, high winds caused more than 200,000 customers to be without power throughout the state.

Coming into Indianapolis, on September 14, Ike also caused disruptions to the first-ever motorcycle Grand Prix held in Indianapolis, stopping both the 125cc and MotoGP races after two-thirds of the race distance, and causing the cancellation of the 250cc race. In Arkansas, about 200,000 customers lost power as a result of the winds, the worst power loss in that state since an ice storm in 2000. In the Louisville area, over 300,000 customers were without power — the worst power outage in the utility's history. The Cincinnati metropolitan area was hard hit as well, with over 927,000 customers losing power in that region. A Duke Energy spokesperson said "We have never seen anything like this. Never. We're talking about 90 percent of our customers without power." There were so many power outages and so few workers available Duke Energy was thinking of sending workers from their base in Charlotte, North Carolina. Many homes and business were without power for 3–7 days.  Cincinnati Public Schools cancelled classes for students for at least three days for all schools. In the Dayton, Ohio area 300,000 of 515,000 Dayton Power & Light Co. customers lost power at some point following severe wind storms on the afternoon of September 14, according to a company spokesperson. Also hard hit were central Ohio (with over 350,000 customers losing power) and northeastern Ohio (with over 310,000 customers losing power), as well as Illinois (49,000), Missouri (85,000), and western Pennsylvania (with over 180,000 customers losing power). In western Kentucky, outside crews had to be brought in from as far away as Mississippi to restore power. In Indiana, about 350,000 customers lost power statewide, mainly in the southern part of the state. In New York State, over 100,000 customers were reported without power. In total, 28 deaths have been blamed on Ike in the inland states.

Canada

In Ontario, Ike's remnants brought a record amount of rain on Sunday, September 14, in the Windsor region. Most damage in the Windsor area with Ike was confined to downed power lines and toppled tree branches with the wind gusts reaching , with spotty street flooding that made driving completely treacherous in some areas. Highways were washed out in the Bruce Peninsula, and trees were uprooted in London, Ontario. The storm continued to cause wind and rain damage as it continued east along the St. Lawrence River leaving around 25,000 customers without electricity, especially in Belleville, Brockville, Bancroft, Peterborough, Bowmanville, Huntsville, and Timmins.

This rain caused small inundations, storm drain overflows, and closed one major highway. In Montreal, high humidity levels pushed by the system caused electrical malfunction one of the lines of the subway, stranding over 25,000 commuters. High winds up to  caused, at their worst, over 25,000 households to lose electricity in Montreal, Laval, Estrie and Montérégie and when it reached the Magdalen Islands, it had enough strength to cause a sailboat, the Océan, to sink. Its six passengers were rescued by a helicopter of the Canadian Coast Guard.

The "Ike Spike" in gasoline prices was quite severe in Canada, with gas prices rising anywhere from 15 to 20 cents per liter.

Iceland
Ike's remnants combined with an unusual depression that affected southwestern Iceland on September 17, three days after Ike became extratropical. The storm produced  waves along southwest coasts of the island. Rainfall peaked near  close to Reykjavík. Strong winds on the backside of the system produced a large dust storm in northern areas of the island.

Aftermath

Turks and Caicos Islands and The Bahamas
Due to the damage brought by Ike in the Turks and Caicos Islands, the insular government declared the islands of Grand Turk and South Caicos as disaster areas. Damage on the islands was surveyed immediately following the hurricane's passage by a CDERA assessment team from Jamaica. Following the occurrence of extensive power outages, the Caribbean Electric Utilities Services Cooperation offered to support the restoration of power services. The British HMS Iron Duke (F234) was sent to the islands to assist in recovery efforts, and personnel from the British Red Cross were also dispatched.

Criticism of aid
After Hurricane Ike, many residents applied to FEMA for loans and FEMA trailers. Many residents were forced to wait several weeks until their trailers arrived. Some waited for up to two months, living in hotels, in homes of relatives several miles away, or in their homes, with no power or running water. Many residents were angry at the response that FEMA gave to the problem. Texas state leaders also accused FEMA of foot dragging and insensitivity.

$3.1 billion in federal aid was eventually allocated to Texas by the Department of Housing and Urban Development. It was supposed to be used to repair single-family homes of lower and middle-class income families, but as of 2011 only 10% of those funds were released, while the rest were held up because of "state bureaucracy".

Public and mental health issues

Hurricane Ike also brought many health issues to the victims. Damages from the homes and the environment helped create these issues amongst the public. Following the disaster, communities were challenged to provide the correct medical treatment in emergency rooms and other medical facilities. It developed stress restricting victims their basic health services. Orange County had an 88.5 percent capacity loss of intermediate care facilities reducing its overall capacity. By late October five hospitals that usually served the areas that were impacted by the hurricane stayed closed while only one hospital continued to operate but with a limit of patients.

The need for mental health services increased after the disaster especially for depression and post-traumatic stress disorder. Most individuals will not progress to constant behavioral or mental health problems, but the World Health Organization estimates between five and ten percent of victims will have more long-term issues. Telephone interviews and mental health diagnoses were ordered randomly to households concerning the effects of Hurricane Ike. Post-disaster mental health occurrences were 5.9 percent for post-traumatic stress disorder, 4.5 percent for major depressive episode, and 9.9 percent for general anxiety disorder. A Galveston Bay Recovery Study (GBRS) was a survey distributed through a random stratified cluster sampling of victims in the Galveston Bay area for research on traumatic stress and disaster exposure. When surveyed victims were asked how they felt and what they experienced after the hurricane there was an immediate emotional response to fear of the loss of property, employment, displacement, and damages. Children were targeted for physical abuse by parents and guardians because of loss of property and employment. Results of post-traumatic stress disorder, depressive symptoms, anxiety symptoms, dysfunctions, and disabilities were reported when asked how stressful their lives have been since Hurricane Ike. There was an increase of impairments, interference with social activities and health behaviors such as eating poorly, smoking more, and restlessness. Development of these mental health problems was due to the lack of sufficient clean clothing, electricity, food, money, transportation, or water for at least one week.

Victims and workers face numerous residential and occupational hazards during the process of repairing their homes or community. An exposure to hazardous materials through the process created health threats of diseases, air contamination, smoke inhalation, and lead poisoning. As disaster victims return to their damaged homes children were exposed to the debris and other hazards, developing a risk of injury. After the hurricane because of power outages individuals and family misused portable generators causing carbon monoxide poisoning. Eighty-two percent to 87 percent of carbon monoxide were caused by the improper use of generators. The Texas Department of State Health Services issued that gasoline generators should not be used indoors. Fifty-four people were reported by the Texas poison centers to have storm-related carbon monoxide exposure. The Undersea and Hyperbaric Medical Society and The Center for Disease Control reported 15 people had to undergo hyperbaric oxygen treatment for carbon monoxide poisoning. Symptoms from exposure were headaches, nausea, and vomiting with the majority of the treated cases under the age of eighteen.

Sports
Hurricane Ike forced the Houston Astros and the Chicago Cubs to play out their 3-game set in Milwaukee at Miller Park.  Ike also forced the postponement of the second-week NFL game between the Houston Texans and the Baltimore Ravens. The game was later made up in Houston after repairs were made to Reliant Stadium on November 9, 2008.  It also forced the NCAA football game on September 13 between the Houston Cougars and the Air Force Falcons to be moved from Robertson Stadium in Houston to Gerald Ford Stadium in Dallas. Ike also forced the postponement of a Texas Longhorns game in Austin, Texas due to increased evacuee traffic in the city's shelters. The Sam Houston Bearkats football game with Prairie View A&M was also canceled. Tickets for World Wrestling Entertainment (WWE) WrestleMania XXV were originally scheduled to go on sale September 20, 2008, but it was postponed due to the effect of Ike on the state of Texas until November 8, 2008.

Relief efforts
There were a number of relief efforts set up to help those caught up in Ike, including one set up by Portlight and Weather Underground. Most of them raised at least $10,000 to help out. The Portlight/Weather Underground effort created some initial controversy springing from the unexpected overwhelming response to requests for assistance.

Portlight delivered over $500,000 worth of equipment to people with disabilities and outlying communities that were impacted by Hurricane Ike.  They also delivered pizza to the residents of the hard-hit Bolivar peninsula and helped provide a Christmas party for residents of Bridge City, Texas.

Direct Relief, an emergency response organization, provided over $1.1 million in hurricane emergency aid as of September 20, 2008. The organization sent shipments that contained medicines, and hygienic supplies.

Oil and gas spills
Hurricane Ike's winds, surge, and giant waves tossed storage tanks and punctured pipelines. However, operators in the Gulf of Mexico (ranging from major integrated producers like BP and Shell to small privately owned independents) shut in operations in advance of Ike's approach as a precautionary measure. By late November, production was restored to pre-Ike levels. Much of the spillage occurred in the High Island area of Galveston County, Texas, where storm surge rose over a low-lying oilfield and flooded the marshy area around several producing wells, beam pumps and storage tanks. During the days both before and after the storm, companies, and residents reported around 448 releases of gas, oil and other substances into the environment in Louisiana and Texas. The hardest hit places were industrial centres near Houston and Port Arthur, Texas, as well as oil production facilities off Louisiana's coast.

The Coast Guard, with the Environmental Protection Agency and state agencies, has responded to more than 3,000 pollution reports associated with the storm and its surge along the upper Texas coast. Most callers complain about abandoned propane tanks, paint cans and other hazardous materials containers turning up in marshes, backyards, and other places.

Collision of oil tanker with drilling rig
On March 6, 2009, a 159,000-ton Norwegian tanker, SKS Satilla, collided with jackup drilling rig Ensco 74, operated by Valaris plc, which had been missing after Ike struck. The tanker's double hull prevented an oil spill at the site, 65 miles south of Galveston, which is 115 miles west of the original position of the rig. Four drilling rigs, including Ensco 74, were damaged by Ike, but Ensco 74 was the only missing rig. At least 52 oil platforms were damaged by Ike.

Retirement

Because of the tremendous damage, number of deaths, and people left missing, the name Ike was officially retired on April 22, 2009, by the World Meteorological Organization, and will never be used again for an Atlantic tropical cyclone. It was replaced with Isaias for the 2014 season. Isaias, however, was not used in 2014. Instead, it was used in 2020 for the first time.

Future mitigation

A commission was established by Rick Perry, the Texas Governor, following the hurricane to investigate preparing for and mitigating future disasters. A proposal has been put forth to build an "Ike Dike", a massive levee system which would protect the Galveston Bay, and the important industrial facilities which line the coast and the ship channel, from a future, potentially more destructive storm. The proposal has gained widespread support from a variety of business interests. , it is currently only at the conceptual stage.

See also

List of costliest Atlantic hurricanes
List of Atlantic hurricane records
List of Cuba hurricanes
List of Texas hurricanes (1980–present)
List of United States hurricanes
List of Category 4 Atlantic hurricanes
1900 Galveston hurricane – a 1900 storm with a similar path to Ike's, which killed over 6,000 people and led to the construction of the Galveston seawall.
Hurricane Beulah – Another Texas hurricane in 1967 that was particularly pernicious to Texans on barrier islands and small peninsulas
Hurricane Harvey – A Category 4 hurricane that caused catastrophic flooding in Texas, becoming the wettest tropical cyclone recorded in the US

Notes

References
General

Specific

External links

The NHC's archive on Hurricane Ike
USGS Coastal Change Hazards: Hurricanes and Extreme Storms – Hurricane Ike

 
Retired Atlantic hurricanes
Cape Verde hurricanes
Category 4 Atlantic hurricanes
2008 natural disasters in the United States
2008 natural disasters
Hurricanes in the Turks and Caicos Islands
Hurricanes in the Bahamas
Hurricanes in Haiti
Hurricanes in Cuba
Hurricanes in Indiana
Hurricanes in Michigan
Houston hurricanes
Hurricanes in Texas
Hurricanes in Louisiana
September 2008 events in North America
Ike